William Kennedy Jr (born 18 April 1997) is an Australian professional rugby league footballer who plays as a  for the Cronulla-Sutherland Sharks in the NRL.

Background
Kennedy was born in Bathurst, New South Wales, Australia. Kennedy Jr is the son of former Balmain Tigers player William 'Bubba' Kennedy.

He played his junior rugby league for Bathurst St Patrick's.

Playing career

2019
In round 6 of the 2019 NRL season, Kennedy made his NRL debut for Cronulla against the Penrith Panthers.
Later in 2019, Kennedy played for Cronulla's feeder club Newtown where he was part of the squads which won the 2019 Canterbury Cup NSW premiership and 2019 NRL State Championship final.

2021
In round 1 of the 2021 NRL season, he scored two tries for Cronulla-Sutherland in a 32-18 victory over rivals St. George at Kogarah Oval.
In round 4 of the 2021 NRL season, he scored two tries for Cronulla in a 48-10 victory over North Queensland at Kogarah Oval.

In round 20 of the 2021 NRL season, he scored two tries for Cronulla in their 22-40 loss against Manly in the "Battle of the Beaches" rivalry match.

In round 23 of the 2021 NRL season against the Wests Tigers, Kennedy scored two tries for Cronulla in a 50-20 victory.

Kennedy played 24 games for Cronulla and scored a total of 14 tries in the 2021 NRL season which saw the club narrowly miss the finals by finishing 9th on the table.

2022
In round 9 of the 2022 NRL season, Kennedy was sent off in the first half of Cronulla's match against the New Zealand Warriors for a dangerous high tackle.  Cronulla would go on to win the match despite being down to 11 men at one point in the game.
In the Qualifying Final, Kennedy scored two tries for Cronulla in a 32-30 loss against North Queensland. Kennedy played a total of 19 matches throughout the year scoring seven tries.

2023
In round 2 of the 2023 NRL season, Kennedy scored a hat-trick in Cronulla's 30-26 victory over Parramatta.

Statistics

NRL
 Statistics are correct as of the end of the 2022 season

All Star

References

External links

Sharks profile

1997 births
Living people
Australian rugby league players
Cronulla-Sutherland Sharks players
Indigenous Australian rugby league players
Newtown Jets NSW Cup players
Rugby league fullbacks
Rugby league players from Bathurst, New South Wales